Elmer George Homrighausen (April 11, 1900 – January 3, 1982) was an American theologian.

Biography
Homrighausen was born in Wheatland, Iowa, and earned an A.B. (1921) from Lakeland College (Wisconsin), a B.Th. (1924) from Princeton Theological Seminary, an M.A. (1920) from Butler University, and a Th.M. (1929) from the University of Dubuque.

He was professor of Christian education at Princeton Theological Seminary from 1938 to 1954, and served as dean of the seminary from 1955 to 1964.

He retired in 1970, and the seminary established a chair of Christian social ethics named in his honor. He also served as vice moderator of the United Presbyterian Church, and on the World Council of Christian Education, Princeton Board of Education, World Council of Churches, and other bodies.

He died in Princeton, New Jersey, aged 81.

He and his wife, Ruth W. Strassburger, raised six children.

External links
Talbot biography
The Elmer George Homrighausen Manuscript Collection

References

1900 births
1982 deaths
American Christian theologians
Princeton Theological Seminary faculty
Princeton Theological Seminary alumni
People from Clinton County, Iowa
People from Princeton, New Jersey
Butler University alumni
University of Dubuque alumni
Lakeland College (Wisconsin) alumni